The following lists events that happened during 2000 in the United Arab Emirates.

Incumbents
President: Zayed bin Sultan Al Nahyan 
Prime Minister: Maktoum bin Rashid Al Maktoum

Events

2000 ACC Trophy.

References

 
Years of the 20th century in the United Arab Emirates
United Arab Emirates
United Arab Emirates
2000s in the United Arab Emirates